Passion: Here for You is an album recorded live at Passion Conferences 2011. It features Chris Tomlin, Matt Redman, Christy Nockels, David Crowder Band and Kristian Stanfill. The songs "Shadows" and "Our God" feature Lecrae.

Track listing

Trivia
 The song "Waiting Here for You", is covered by Martin Smith, Jesus Culture, Soul Survivor and Generación 12, in Spanish "Esperándote".

References

2011 live albums
Passion Conferences albums